Melilla is an autonomous city of Spain in North Africa. It lies on the eastern side of the Cape Three Forks, bordering Morocco and facing the Mediterranean Sea. It was part of the Province of Málaga until 14 March 1995, when the Statute of Autonomy of Melilla was passed.

Melilla is one of the special member state territories of the European Union. Movements to and from the rest of the EU and Melilla are subject to specific rules, provided for inter alia in the Accession Agreement of Spain to the Schengen Convention.

As of 2019, Melilla had a population of 86,487. The population is chiefly divided between people of Iberian and Riffian extraction. There is also a small number of Sephardic Jews and Sindhi Hindus. Melilla features a diglossia between the official Spanish (strong language) and Tarifit (weak language).

Like the autonomous city of Ceuta and Spain's other territories in Africa, Melilla is subject to an irredentist claim by Morocco.

Names 
Melilla's original name (currently rendered as Rusadir) was a Punic language name, coming from the name of the nearby Cape Three Forks. Addir meant "powerful". The name creation is similar to that of other names given in Antiquity to outlets along the North African coast, including Rusguniae, Rusubbicari, Rusuccuru, Rusippisir, Rusigan (Rachgoun), Rusicade, Ruspina, Ruspe or Rsmlqr.

Others relate the name to "discord" or "fever" or to an ancient Arab personality.

History

Antiquity and Middle Ages 
Melilla was a Phoenician and later Punic trade establishment under the name Rusadir (Rusaddir for the Romans and Russadeiron for the Greeks). Later, Rome absorbed it as part of the Roman province of Mauretania Tingitana. Ptolemy (IV, 1) and Pliny (V, 18) mention Rusaddir, calling it "oppidum et portus" (a fortified town and port). It was also cited by Mela (I, 33) as Rusicada, and by the Itinerarium Antonini. Rusaddir was said to have once been the seat of a bishop, but there is no record of any bishop of the purported see, which is not included in the Catholic Church's list of titular sees.

As centuries passed, it was ruled by Vandal, Byzantine and Visigoth bands. The political history is similar to that of towns in the region of the Moroccan Rif and southern Spain. Local rule passed through a succession of Phoenician, Punic, Roman, Umayyad, Cordobese, Idrisid, Almoravid, Almohad, Marinid, and then Wattasid rulers.

Early Modern period 
During the 15th century, the city subsumed into decadence, like most of the cities of the Kingdom of Fez along the Mediterranean coast, eclipsed by those along the Atlantic facade. After the Catholic Monarchs' conquest of the Nasrid Kingdom of Granada in 1492, their Secretary  compiled information about the sorry state of the north African coast with the prospect of a potential territorial expansion in mind, sending field agents to investigate, and subsequently reporting to the Catholic Monarchs that, by early 1494, locals had expelled the authority of the Sultan of Fez and had offered to pledge service. While the 1494 Treaty of Tordesillas put Melilla and Cazaza (until then reserved to the Portuguese) under the sphere of Castile, the conquest of the city had to wait, delayed by Charles VIII of France's occupation of Naples.
Melilla was occupied on 17 September 1497 virtually without violence as it was on the border between the Kingdom of Tlemcen and the Kingdom of Fez, and as a result had been fought over many times and been left abandoned. No large-scale expansion into the Kingdom of Fez ensued, and, barring the enterprises of the Cardinal Cisneros along the coast in Mers El Kébir and Oran (in the Algerian coast), and the rock of Badis (in the territorial scope of the Kingdom of Fez), the Hispanic monarchy's imperial impetus was eventually directed elsewhere, to the Italian Wars waged against France, and, particularly since 1519, to the newly discovered continent across the Atlantic.

Melilla was initially jointly administered by the House of Medina Sidonia and the Crown, and a 1498 settlement forced the former to station a 700-men garrison in Melilla and forced the latter to provide the city with a number of maravedíes and wheat fanegas. The Crown's interest in Melilla decreased during the reign of Charles V. During the 16th century, soldiers stationed in Melilla were badly remunerated, leading to many desertions. The Duke of Medina Sidonia relinquished responsibility over the garrison of the place on 7 June 1556.

During the late 17th century, Alaouite sultan Ismail Ibn Sharif attempted to conquer the presidio, taking the outer fortifications in the 1680s and further unsuccessfully besieging Melilla in the 1690s.

One Spanish officer reflected, "an hour in Melilla, from the point of view of merit, was worth more than thirty years of service to Spain."

Late Modern period 
The current limits of the Spanish territory around the Melilla fortress were fixed by treaties with Morocco in 1859, 1860, 1861, and 1894. In the late 19th century, as Spanish influence expanded in this area, the Crown authorized Melilla as the only centre of trade on the Rif coast between Tetuan and the Algerian frontier. The value of trade increased, with goat skins, eggs and beeswax being the principal exports, and cotton goods, tea, sugar and candles being the chief imports.

Melilla's civil population in 1860 still amounted to only 375 estimated inhabitants. In a 1866 Hispano-Moroccan arrangement signed in Fes, both parts agreed to allow for the installment of a customs office near the border with Melilla, to be operated by Moroccan officials. The Treaty of Peace with Morocco that followed the 1859–60 War entailed the acquisition of a new perimeter for Melilla, bringing its area to the 12 km2 the autonomous city currently stands. Following the declaration of Melilla as free port in 1863, the population began to increase, chiefly by Sephardi Jews fleeing from Tetouan who fostered trade in and out the city. The first Jews from Tetouan probably arrived in 1864, meanwhile the first rabbi arrived in 1867 and began to operate the first synagogue, located in the Calle de San Miguel. Many Jews arrived fleeing from persecution in Morocco, instigated by Roghi Bu Hamara. Following the 1868 lifting of the veto to emigrate to Melilla from Peninsular Spain, the population further increased with Spaniards. The Jewish population, who also progressively acquired Spanish citizenship, increased to 572 in 1893. The economic opportunities created in Melilla henceforth favoured the installment of a Berber population.

The first proper body of local government was the junta de arbitrios, created in 1879, and in which the military used to enjoy preponderance. The Polígono excepcional de Tiro, the first neighborhood outside the walled core (Melilla la Vieja), began construction in 1888.

In 1893, Riffian tribesmen launched the First Melillan campaign to take back this area; the Spanish government sent 25,000 soldiers to defend against them. The conflict was also known as the Margallo War, after Spanish General Juan García y Margallo, Governor of Melilla, who was killed in the battle. The new 1894 agreement with Morocco that followed the conflict increased trade with the hinterland, bringing the economic prosperity of the city to a new level. The total population of Melilla amounted for 10,004 inhabitants in 1896.

The turn of the new century saw attempts by France (based in French Algeria) to profit from their newly acquired sphere of influence in Morocco to counter Melilla's trading prowess by fostering trade links with the Algerian cities of Ghazaouet and Oran. Melilla began to suffer from this, to which the instability brought by revolts against Muley Abdel Aziz in the hinterland also added, although after 1905 Sultan pretender El Rogui (Bou Hmara) carried out a defusing policy in the area that favoured Spain. The French occupation of Oujda in 1907 compromised the Melillan trade with that city, and the enduring instability in the Rif still threatened Melilla. Between 1909 and 1945, the modernista (Art Nouveau) style was prevalent in local architecture, making Melilla's streets a "true museum of modernista-style architecture", second only to Barcelona, mainly stemming from the work of architect Enrique Nieto.

Mining companies began to enter the hinterland of Melilla by 1908. Thus two mining companies under the protection of Bou Hmara, started mining lead and iron 20 kilometers (12.4 miles) from Melilla. They started to construct a railway between the port and the mines. In October of that year, Bou Hmara's vassals revolted against him and raided the mines, which remained closed until June 1909. By July the workmen were again attacked and several were killed. Severe fighting between the Spaniards and the tribesmen followed, in the Second Melillan campaign that took place in the vicinity of Melilla.

In 1910, the Spaniards restarted the mines and undertook harbor works at Mar Chica, but hostilities broke out again in 1911. On 22 July 1921, the Berbers under the leadership of Abd el Krim inflicted a grave defeat on the Spanish at the Battle of Annual. The Spanish retreated to Melilla, leaving most of the protectorate under the control of the Republic of Rif.

A "junta municipal" with a rather civil composition was created in 1927; on 10 April 1930, an ayuntamiento featuring the same membership as the junta was created, equalling to the same municipal regime as the rest of Spain on 14 April 1931, with the arrival of the first democratically elected municipal corporation on the wake of the proclamation of the Second Republic.

The city was used as one of the staging grounds for the July 1936 military coup d'état that started the Spanish Civil War.

In the context of the passing of the Ley de Extranjería in 1986, and following social mobilization from the Berber community, conditions for citizenship acquisition were flexibilised and allowed for the naturalisation of a substantial number of inhabitants, until then born in Melilla but without Spanish citizenship.

Recent developments 
In 1995, Melilla (until then just another municipality of the Province of Málaga) became an "autonomous city", as the Statute of Autonomy of Melilla was passed.

On 6 November 2007, King Juan Carlos I and Queen Sofia visited Melilla, which caused a demonstration of support. The visit also sparked protests from the Moroccan government. It was the first time a Spanish monarch had visited Melilla in 80 years.

Melilla (and Ceuta) declared the Muslim holiday of Eid al-Adha, or Feast of the Sacrifice, an official public holiday from 2010 onward. It is the first time a non-Christian religious festival has been officially celebrated in Spain since the Reconquista.

In 2018, Morocco decided to close the customs office near Melilla, in operation since the mid-19th century, without consulting the counterparty. The customs office was expected to reopen in January 2023.

Geography

Location 

Melilla is in northwest Africa, on the shores of the Alboran Sea, a marginal sea of the Mediterranean, the latter's westernmost portion.

The Moroccan settlement of Beni Ansar lies immediately south of Melilla. The nearest Moroccan city is Nador, and the ports of Melilla and Nador are within the same bay; nearby is the Bou Areg Lagoon.

Climate 
Melilla has a warm Mediterranean climate influenced by its proximity to the sea, rendering much cooler summers and more precipitation than inland areas deeper into Africa. The climate, in general, is similar to the southern coast of peninsular Spain and the northern coast of Morocco, with relatively small temperature differences between seasons.

Government and administration

Self-government institutions 

The government bodies stipulated in the Statute of Autonomy are the Assembly of Melilla, the President of Melilla and the Council of Government. The assembly is a 25-member body whose members are elected through universal suffrage every 4 years in closed party lists following the schedule of local elections at the national level. Its members are called "local deputies" but they rather enjoy the status of concejales (municipal councillors). Unlike regional legislatures (and akin to municipal councils), the assembly does not enjoy right of initiative for primary legislation.

The president of Melilla (who, often addressed as Mayor-President, also exerts the roles of Mayor, president of the Assembly, president of the Council of Government and representative of the city) is invested by the Assembly. After local elections, the president is invested through a qualified majority from among the leaders of the election lists, or, failing to achieve the former, the leader of the most voted list at the election is invested to the office. In case of a motion of no confidence the president can only be ousted with a qualified majority voting for an alternative assembly member.

The Council of Government is the traditional collegiate executive body for parliamentary systems. Unlike the municipal government boards in the standard ayuntamientos, the members of the Council of Government (including the vice-presidents) do not need to be members of the assembly.

Melilla is the city in Spain with the highest proportion of postal voting; vote buying (via mail-in ballots) is widely reported to be a common practice in the poor neighborhoods of Melilla. Court cases in this matter had involved the PP, the CPM and the PSOE.

On 15 June 2019, following the May 2019 Melilla Assembly election, the regionalist and left-leaning party of Muslim and Amazigh persuasion Coalition for Melilla (CPM, 8 seats), the Spanish Socialist Workers' Party (PSOE, 4 seats) and Citizens–Party of the Citizenry (Cs, 1 seat) voted in favour of the Cs' candidate (Eduardo de Castro) as the Presidency of the Autonomous City, ousting Juan José Imbroda, from the People's Party (PP, 10 seats), who had been in office since 2000.

Melilla also maintains a local police force known as Policia Local de Melilla (Ciudad Autonoma de Melilla - Policia Local)

Administrative subdivisions 

Melilla is subdivided into eight districts (distritos), which are further subdivided into neighbourhoods (barrios):

1st
Barrio de Medina Sidonia.
Barrio del General Larrea.
Barrio de Ataque Seco.
2nd
Barrio Héroes de España.
Barrio del General Gómez Jordana.
Barrio Príncipe de Asturias.
3rd
Barrio del Carmen.
4th
Barrio Polígono Residencial La Paz.
Barrio Hebreo-Tiro Nacional.
5th
Barrio de Cristóbal Colón.
Barrio de Cabrerizas.
Barrio de Batería Jota.
Barrio de Hernán Cortes y Las Palmeras.
Barrio de Reina Regente.
6th
Barrio de Concepción Arenal.
Barrio Isaac Peral (Tesorillo).
7th
Barrio del General Real.
Polígono Industrial SEPES.
Polígono Industrial Las Margaritas.
Parque Empresarial La Frontera.
8th
Barrio de la Libertad.
Barrio del Hipódromo.
Barrio de Alfonso XIII.
Barrio Industrial.
Barrio Virgen de la Victoria.
Barrio de la Constitución.
Barrio de los Pinares.
Barrio de la Cañada de Hidum

Economy 
The Gross domestic product (GDP) of the autonomous community was 1.6 billion euros in 2018, accounting for 0.1% of Spanish economic output. GDP per capita adjusted for purchasing power was 19,900 euros or 66% of the EU27 average in the same year. Melilla was the NUTS2 region with the lowest GDP per capita in Spain.

Melilla does not participate in the European Union Customs Union (EUCU). There is no VAT (IVA) tax, but a local reduced-rate tax called IPSI. Preserving the status of free port, imports are free of tariffs and the only tax concerning them is the IPSI. Exports to the Customs Union (including Peninsular Spain) are however subject to the correspondent customs tariff and are taxed with the correspondent VAT. There are some special manufacturing taxes regarding electricity and transport, as well as complementary charges on tobacco and oil and fuel products.

The principal industry is fishing. Cross-border commerce (legal or smuggled) and Spanish and European grants and wages are the other income sources.

Melilla is regularly connected to the Iberian peninsula by air and sea traffic and is also economically connected to Morocco: most of its fruit and vegetables are imported across the border. Moroccans in the city's hinterland are attracted to it: 36,000 Moroccans cross the border daily to work, shop or trade goods. The port of Melilla offers several daily connections to Almería and Málaga. Melilla Airport offers daily flights to Almería, Málaga and Madrid. Spanish operators Air Europa and Iberia operate in Melilla's airport.

Many people travelling between Europe and Morocco use the ferry links to Melilla, both for passengers and for freight. Because of this, the port and related companies form an important economic driver for the city.

Tourism 

In order to boost growth and as a measure to promote tourism in the Autonomous City of Melilla, the Tourist Board has developed a Regulatory Decree for bonuses for Tourist Packages to Melilla.

The Tourist package consists of the application of discounts on return tickets by plane or boat provided that they include accommodation during the stay in Melilla in one of the types of tourist accommodation or at the home of a resident of the city and do not exceed , between the round trip dates, ten days.

Water supply 

Melilla's water supply primarily came from a network of dug wells (which by the turn of the 21st century suffered from overexploitation and had also experienced a degradation of the water quality and the intrusion of seawater), as well as the capture of the Río de Oro's underflow. Seeking to address the water supply problem, works for the construction of a desalination plant in the Aguadú cliffs, projected to produce  a day, started in November 2003. The plant entered operation in March 2007. Its daily operation is partially funded by the central government. Relative to the Spanish average (and similarly to the Canary and Balearic Islands), the city's population spends a comparatively larger amount of money on bottled water.

Architecture 
The dome of the Chapel of Santiago, built in the mid-16th century by Miguel de Perea with help from Sancho de Escalante, is a rare instance of Gothic architecture in the African continent.

Parallel to the urban development of Melilla in the early 20th century, the new architectural style of modernismo (irradiated from Barcelona and associated to the bourgeois class) was imported to the city, granting it a modernista architectural character, primarily through the works of the prolific Catalan architect Enrique Nieto.

Accordingly, Melilla has the second most important concentration of Modernista works in Spain after Barcelona. Nieto was in charge of designing the main Synagogue, the Central Mosque and various Catholic Churches.

Demographics

Religion 

Melilla has been praised as an example of multiculturalism, being a small city in which one can find Christians, Muslims, Jews, Hindus, and Buddhists represented. There is a small, autonomous, and commercially important Hindu community present in Melilla, which has fallen over the past decades as its members move to the Spanish mainland and numbers about 100 members today. According to the Spanish Center for Sociological Research, Roman Catholicism is the largest religion in Melilla. In 2019, the proportion of Melillans that identify themselves as Roman Catholic was 65.0% (41.7% define themselves as not practising, while 23.3% as practising). 20% identify as followers of other faiths, 11.7% identify as non-believers, and 3.3% identify as atheists. Muslims may account for roughly half the population in Melilla.

The Roman Catholic churches in Melilla belong to the Diocese of Málaga.

Language 
Melilla features a diglossia, with Spanish the strong and official language and Tarifit the weak and unofficial language, with limited written codification, and usage restricted to family and domestic relations and oral speech.

The population can be thus divided into monolingual Spanish speakers of European ethnic origin (without competence in any other language than those formally taught at school); those descended from Tamazight-speaking parents, usually bilingual in Spanish and Tamazight; and Moroccan immigrants and cross-border workers, with a generally dominant Tamazight language (with some also competent in Arabic) and a L2 competence in Spanish. The Spanish spoken in Melilla is similar to the Andalusian variety from Cádiz, whereas the Berber variant spoken in Melilla is the Riffian language common with the neighbouring Nador area. Rather than Berber, Berber speakers in Melilla use either the glotonym , or, in Spanish,  for their language.

The first attempt to legislate a degree of recognition for Berber in Melilla was in 1994, in the context of the elaboration of the Statute of Autonomy, by mentioning the promotion of the linguistic and cultural pluralism (without explicitly mentioning the Berber language). The initiative went nowhere, voted down by PP and PSOE. Reasons cited for not recognizing Tamazight are related to the argument that the variety is not standardized.

Border security

Defence and Civil Guard 
The defence of the enclave is the responsibility of the Spanish Armed Forces' General Command of Melilla. The Spanish Army's combat components of the command include:

 52nd Regulares Infantry Regiment;
 1st Tercio Gran Capitán Regiment of the Spanish Legion;
 10th 'Alcántara' Cavalry Regiment equipped with Leopard 2 main battle tanks and Pizarro infantry fighting vehicles;
 32nd Mixed Artillery Regiment with Grupo de Artillería de Campaña I/32 equipped with 155/52mm towed howitzers and Grupo de Artillería Antiaérea II/32 equipped with 35/90 SKYDOR/35/90 GDF-007 anti-aircraft guns; and,
 8th Engineer Regiment

The command also includes its headquarters battalion as well as logistics elements.

In addition to the defence of Melilla, the garrison is also responsible for the defence of islands and rock formations claimed by Spain off the coast of Morocco. Units of the garrison are deployed to these rock formations to secure them against Moroccan incursions and did so notably during the Perejil Island crisis in 2002. To enhance coastal security, the Spanish Navy plans to base a dedicated patrol boat in Melilla by mid-2023. Melilla itself is about  distant from the main Spanish naval base at Rota on the Spanish mainland while the Spanish Air Force's Morón Air Base is within  proximity.

The Civil Guard is responsible for border security and protects both the territory's fortified land border against frequent, and sometimes significant, migrant incursions.

Trans-border relations 
Melilla forms a sort of trans-border urban conurbation with limited integration together with the neighbouring Moroccan settlements, located at one of the ends of a linear succession of urban sprawl spanning southward in Morocco along the R19 road from Beni Ensar down to Nador and Selouane. The urban system features a high degree of hierarchization, specialization and division of labour, with Melilla as chief provider of services, finance and trade; Nador as an eminently industrial city whereas the rest of Moroccan settlements found themselves in a subordinate role, presenting agro-town features and operating as providers of workforce.

The asymmetry, as reflected for example in the provision of healthcare, has fostered situations such as the large-scale use of the Melillan health services by Moroccan citizens, with Melilla attending a number of urgencies more than four times the standard for its population in 2018. In order to satisfy the workforce needs of Melilla (mainly in areas such as domestic service, construction and cross-border bale workers, often under informal contracts), Moroccan inhabitants of the province of Nador were granted exemptions from visa requirement to enter the autonomous city. This development in turn induced a strong flux of internal migration from other Moroccan provinces to Nador, in order to acquire the aforementioned exemption.

The 'fluid' trans-border relations between Melilla and its surroundings are however not free from conflict, as they are contingent upon the 'tense' trans-national relations between Morocco and Spain.

Securing the border 

Following the increasing influx of Algerian and sub-Saharan irregular migrants into Ceuta and Melilla in the early 1990s, a process of border fortification in both cities ensued after 1995 to reduce the border's permeability, a target attained to some degree by 1999, although peak level of fortification was reached in 2005.

Since 2005, at least 14 migrants have died trying to cross the fence. The Melilla migrant reception centre was built with a capacity of 480.

In June 2022, at least 23 sub-Saharan migrants and two Moroccan security personnel were killed when around 2,000 migrants stormed the border. The death toll has been estimated to be as high as 37 by certain NGOs. Around 200 Spanish and Moroccan law enforcement officers and at least 76 migrants were injured. Hundreds of migrants succeeded in breaching the fence, and 133 made it across the border. Widely circulated footage showed dozens of motionless migrants piled together. It was the worst such incident in Melilla's history. The United Nations, the African Union and a number of human rights groups condemned what they deemed excessive force used by Moroccan and Spanish border guards, although no lethal weapons were employed, and the deaths were later attributed to "mechanical asphyxiation".

Morocco has been paid tens of million euros by both Spain and the European Union to outsource the EU migration control.

Transportation 

Melilla Airport is serviced by Air Nostrum, flying to the Spanish cities of Málaga, Madrid, Barcelona, Las Palmas de Gran Canaria, Palma de Mallorca, Granada, Badajoz, Sevilla and Almería. In April 2013, a local enterprise set up Melilla Airlines, flying from the city to Málaga. The city is linked to Málaga, Almería and Motril by ferry.

Three roads connect Melilla and Morocco but require clearance through border checkpoints.

Sport 
Melilla is a surfing destination. The city's football club, UD Melilla, plays in the third tier of Spanish football, the Segunda División B. The club was founded in 1943 and since 1945 have played at the 12,000-seater Estadio Municipal Álvarez Claro. Until the other club was dissolved in 2012, UD Melilla played the Ceuta-Melilla derby against AD Ceuta. The clubs travelled to each other via the Spanish mainland to avoid entering Morocco. The second-highest ranked club in the city are Casino del Real CF of the fourth-tier Tercera División. The football's governing institution is the Melilla Football Federation.

Dispute with Morocco 
The government of Morocco has repeatedly called for Spain to transfer the sovereignty of Ceuta and Melilla, along with uninhabited islets such as the Alhucemas Islands, the rock of Vélez de la Gomera and the Perejil island, drawing comparisons with Spain's territorial claim to Gibraltar. In both cases, the national governments and local populations of the disputed territories reject these claims by a large majority. The Spanish position states that both Ceuta and Melilla are integral parts of Spain, and have been since the 16th century, centuries prior to Morocco's independence from France in 1956, whereas Gibraltar, being a British Overseas Territory, is not and never has been part of the United Kingdom. Both cities also have the same semi-autonomous status as the mainland region in Spain. Melilla has been under Spanish rule for longer than cities in northern Spain such as Pamplona or Tudela, and was conquered roughly in the same period as the last Muslim cities of Southern Spain such as Granada, Málaga, Ronda or Almería: Spain claims that the enclaves were established before the creation of the Kingdom of Morocco. Morocco denies these claims and maintains that the Spanish presence on or near its coast is a remnant of the colonial past which should be ended. The United Nations list of non-self-governing territories does not include these Spanish territories and the dispute remains bilaterally debated between Spain and Morocco.

In 1986, Spain entered the North Atlantic Treaty Organization. However Ceuta and Melilla are not under NATO protection since Article 6 of the treaty limits the coverage to Europe and North America and islands north of the Tropic of Cancer. This contrasts with French Algeria which was explicitly included in the treaty. Legal experts have interpreted that other articles could cover the Spanish North African cities but this take has not been tested in practice. On the occasion of NATO's Madrid Summit in 2022, the issue of the protection Ceuta and Melilla was a prominent one with NATO Secretary General Jens Stoltenberg stating: "On which territories NATO protects and Ceuta and Melilla, NATO is there to protect all Allies against any threats. At the end of the day, it will always be a political decision to invoke Article 5, but rest assured NATO is there to protect and defend all Allies".

On 21 December 2020, after Moroccan Prime Minister Saadeddine Othmani said that Ceuta and Melilla "are Moroccan as the [Western] Sahara [is]", Spain urgently summoned the Moroccan Ambassador to convey that Spain expects respect from all its partners to the sovereignty and territorial integrity of its country and asked for explanation of Othmani's words.

Notable people

Twin towns – sister cities 

Melilla is twinned with:

  Caracas (Venezuela).
  Cavite City (Philippines).
  Ceuta (Spain).
  Toledo (Spain).
  Málaga (Spain).
  Montevideo (Uruguay).
  Motril (Spain); since January 2008.
  Almería (Spain).
  Mantua (Italy); since September 2013.
  Vélez-Málaga (Spain); since January 2014.
  Antequera (Spain); as of 2016, in process.

See also 

 European enclaves in North Africa before 1830
 Melilla (Congress of Deputies constituency)

References 
Citations

Bibliography

External links 

  
 Postal Codes Melilla

 
Autonomous cities of Spain
Enclaves and exclaves
Mediterranean port cities and towns in Spain
Morocco–Spain border crossings
NUTS 2 statistical regions of the European Union
Port cities in Africa
Special territories of the European Union
States and territories established in 1995
Territorial disputes of Morocco
Territorial disputes of Spain